Brady Keys (May 19, 1936 – October 24, 2017) was a Texan American football player. He played as a defensive back for eight seasons in the NFL. He played college football at Colorado State as a halfback as well as a defensive back. Keys led the 1960 Colorado State team in rushing yards and total offense.

Keys was also America's first black owner of a national fast food franchise.

Career 
After being turned down for loans by a variety of banks he was loaned his seed money by Dan Rooney, then manager of the Pittsburgh Steelers, to establish All Pro Fried Chicken, through which he became America's first black franchisor. His first store opened in January 1967 and at its peak, All Pro Fried Chicken, had 150 franchises and was run by Keys as a family business.

In 1969 he decided he needed to diversify and following a meeting with James McLamore he agreed to take on a struggling  Burger King franchise in Detroit, which he turned around using a series of innovative approaches, being credited by some for coming up with Burger King's famous saying 'Have it your way'. By 1988 he owned 13 restaurants in Detroit. 

In September 1970 he entered into a joint venture with Kentucky Fried Chicken to take a 50 percent stake in 6 stores in the Detroit area, as a condition to this agreement he was required to liquidate all of his All Pro Fried Chicken restaurants, most of which were sold to the franchisees. By 1972 he owned these six restaurants outright.

In 1982 due to increased competition the stores had run into trouble and to secure their long term future KFC offered him to swap these six restaurants for four anywhere else in the country under the normal terms of a franchisee to which he agreed choosing four restaurants based in Albany. By 2002, when he exited the business, he owned 11 KFC franchises.

Death
Keys died on October 24, 2017 after complications from a stroke. He was buried at Inglewood Park Cemetery.

Legacy 
Throughout his pioneering business career Keys consistently advocated for black-owned businesses, including founding both Burger King's and KFC's Minority Franchise Associations. He was the first black board member of the International Franchise Association. In 1971 he successfully lobbied Burger King to award the contract for its first inner city restaurant construction to a Black-owned business. In 1972 he was appointed to President Nixon's Minority Business Advisory Board. In 1973 he testified in front of Congress about his work in franchising and opportunities for minorities. In 1986 whilst on the executive board of the Burger King/PUSH Economic Development Covenant he was instrumental on securing an agreement with Burger King to funnel $750,000 into the black community, which at the time was the largest commitment made by any fast-food company.

References

1936 births
2017 deaths
African-American players of American football
Players of American football from Austin, Texas
American football cornerbacks
Pittsburgh Steelers players
Minnesota Vikings players
St. Louis Cardinals (football) players
Eastern Conference Pro Bowl players
Colorado State Rams football players
Burials at Inglewood Park Cemetery